Jovan Jovanović (born 11 October 1991) is a Serbian rower.

Jovanović was born in 1991 in Smederevo. His parents are Slobodan and Svetlana Jovanović. He won a gold medal at the 2011 World Rowing U23 Championships in men's coxed four and posted a U23 world record. He repeated the success in 2012. Currently, Jovan is coaching at Oakland Strokes.

References

1991 births
Living people
Serbian male rowers
Sportspeople from Smederevo